Geodermatophilus pulveris is a gamma-ray resistant and  aerobic bacterium from the genus Geodermatophilus which has been isolated from limestone dust from Grand Erg Oriental in Tunisia.

References

Bacteria described in 2016
Actinomycetia